Caballeronia choica is a bacterium from the genus Caballeronia.

References

Burkholderiaceae
Bacteria described in 2013